Anomalous pulmonary venous connection (or anomalous pulmonary venous drainage or anomalous pulmonary venous return) is a congenital defect of the pulmonary veins.

Total anomalous pulmonary venous connection
Total anomalous pulmonary venous connection, also known as total anomalous pulmonary venous return, is a rare cyanotic congenital heart defect in which all four pulmonary veins are malpositioned and make anomalous connections to the systemic venous circulation. (Normally, pulmonary veins return oxygenated blood from the lungs to the left atrium where it can then be pumped to the rest of the body). A patent foramen ovale, patent ductus arteriosus or an atrial septal defect must be present, or else the condition is fatal due to a lack of systemic blood flow.

In some cases, it can be detected prenatally.

There are four variants: Supracardiac (50%): blood drains to one of the innominate veins (brachiocephalic veins) or the superior vena cava; Cardiac (20%), where blood drains into coronary sinus or directly into right atrium; Infradiaphragmatic (20%), where blood drains into portal or hepatic veins; and a mixed (10%) variant.

TAPVC can occur with obstruction, which occurs when the anomalous vein enters a vessel at an acute angle and can cause pulmonary venous hypertension and cyanosis because blood cannot enter the new vein as easily.

Signs and symptoms
 right ventricular heave
 Loud S1
 fixed split S2
 S3 gallop
 systolic ejection murmur at left upper sternal border
 cardiomegaly
 right axis deviation on ECG
 Snowman sign or 'figure of 8 configuration' on chest radiograph
 right ventricular hypertrophy
 cyanosis, tachypnea, dyspnea since the overloaded pulmonary circuit can cause pulmonary edema
 Cottage-loaf sign, that is, chest X-ray appearance similar to a cottage loaf, also known as the 'snow man' sign or 'figure of 8' sign.

Treatment
In TAPVC without obstruction, surgical redirection can be performed within the first month of life. The operation is performed under general anesthesia. The four pulmonary veins are reconnected to the left atrium, and any associated heart defects such as atrial septal defect, ventricular septal defect, patent foramen ovale, and/or patent ductus arteriosus are surgically closed. With obstruction, surgery should be undertaken emergently. PGE1 should be given because a patent ductus arteriosus allows oxygenated blood to go from the circulation of the right heart to the systemic circulation.

Partial anomalous pulmonary venous connection
A Partial anomalous pulmonary venous connection (or Partial anomalous pulmonary venous drainage or Partial anomalous pulmonary venous return) is a congenital defect where the left atrium is the point of return for the blood from some (but not all) of the pulmonary veins.

It is less severe than total anomalous pulmonary venous connection which is a life-threatening anomaly requiring emergent surgical correction, usually diagnosed in the first few days of life. Partial anomalous venous connection may be diagnosed at any time from birth to old age.  The severity of symptoms, and thus the likelihood of diagnosis, varies significantly depending on the amount of blood flow through the anomalous connections.  In less severe cases, with smaller amounts of blood flow, diagnosis may be delayed until adulthood, when it can be confused with other causes of pulmonary hypertension.  There is also evidence that a significant number of mild cases are never diagnosed, or diagnosed incidentally.  It is associated with other vascular anomalies, and some genetic syndromes such as Turner syndrome.

Diagnosis 
It can be diagnosed with CT scan,  angiography, transesophageal echocardiography, or cardiac MRI.  Unfortunately, less invasive and expensive testing, such as transthoracic echocardiography and CT scanning are generally less sensitive.

Treatment 
It is sometimes treated with surgery, which involves rerouting blood from the right atrium into the left atrium with a patch or use of the Warden procedure.  However, interest is increasing in catheter-based interventional approaches, as well as medical therapy for less severe cases.

References

External links 

Congenital vascular defects